The European College of Business and Management (ECBM) was established in 1988 and is the training arm of the German-British Chamber of Industry and Commerce (AHK) in London. It is located in the heart of London.

The ECBM provides international accredited business and management programmes. It has developed various partnerships with Chambers of Commerce within Europe and is supported by companies.

ECBM specialises in providing opportunities for the German market, based on programmes offered by its partner universities in the UK.

Programmes
Programmes offered by the ECBM include:

Intensive Courses (Professional Development Programmes)
 Bachelor of Arts (Hons) in Business Studies
Part-time programme offered  in partnership with the University of South Wales.
 Master of Business Administration (MBA)
Part-time programme offered and accredited in cooperation with Liverpool John Moores University. 
 Master of Science (MSc) in International Business and Management
Part-time programme offered and accredited in cooperation with Liverpool John Moores University

The undergraduate and postgraduate programmes are delivered in English via ‘Blended Learning’, a combination of virtual distance learning and physical resources. The teaching sessions mainly take place on weekend seminars in Germany, London or Spain.

ECBM is a collaborative partner of the University of South Wales.

Business schools in England
Educational institutions established in 1988
1988 establishments in England
Education in the London Borough of Hackney